Kristineberg metro station is a station on the Green line of the Stockholm metro. It is located in the district of Kristineberg, which is in the borough of Kungsholmen in central Stockholm. The station is located above ground alongside Drottningholmsvägen on its approach to the eastern end of the Tranebergsbron bridge. It has a single island platform, with access from Nordenflychtsvägen, which passes under the station and bridge approach.

The station was inaugurated on 26 October 1952 as a part of the section of line between Hötorget and Vällingby.

Gallery

References

Green line (Stockholm metro) stations
Railway stations opened in 1952